Tungsten(VI) oxytetrafluoride (WOF4) is an inorganic chemical compound.

Preparation 
Tungsten(VI) oxytetrafluoride can be synthesized by the reaction of fluorine and tungsten trioxide.

It can also be obtained by reacting tungsten with a mixture of oxygen and fluorine at high temperatures. Partial hydrolysis of tungsten hexafluoride will also produce WOF4.
WF6 + H2O -> WOF4 + 2 HF
The reaction of tungsten(VI) oxytetrachloride and hydrogen fluoride will also produce WOF4.
WOCl4 + 4HF -> WOF4 + 4HCl
WOF4 can also prepared by the reaction of lead(II) fluoride and tungsten trioxide at 700 °C.
2PbF2 + WO3 -> WOF4 + 2PbO

Properties
Tungsten(VI) oxytetrafluoride is a colourless solid which hydrolyze into tungstic acid.
WOF4 + 2 H2O -> WO3 + 4 HF
Solid WOF4 is previously assumed as a tetramer, which was later questioned by spectroscopic investigations. In the gas state, this molecule has a monomeric structure. It can form complexes with acetonitrile and other compounds.

References

Metal halides
Tungsten compounds
Oxyfluorides